, known mononymously as Morrie, is a Japanese singer-songwriter. He is best known as vocalist and co-founder of the influential heavy metal band Dead End, active from 1984 to 1990, and Morrie's distinctive visual appearance and rough vocal style inspired many later prominent musicians in Japan's visual kei movement. When they disbanded, he began a solo career for five years, before moving to New York City and going into hiatus. He reemerged in 2005 with the solo project Creature Creature, which utilizes several well-known Japanese musicians, reunited with Dead End four years later, and released his first solo album in twenty years in 2015.

History

1984–1995: Dead End and solo career 

In December 1984, Morrie formed Dead End alongside his fellow former-Liar bandmate, Takahiro Kagawa, Tadashi Masumoto ("Crazy Cool Joe") and Masaaki Tano. Only he and Joe remained, and until the 1987 were joined by Yuji Adachi ("You") and Masafumi Minato, just before they signed a major contract with Victor Entertainment. Although achieved only limited commercial success in their homeland until January 1990, they managed to have a contract with an American label with their songs and videos aired on MTV and radio stations. Morrie's distinctive visual appearance and rough vocal style inspired many later prominent musicians in Japan's visual kei movement.

In 1990, Morrie started a solo career and gradually went to live in New York City. He went there because was interested, besides the Avant-garde music scene, in the production work by Roli Mosimann on Infected and Mind Bomb by The The. Ultimately, Mosimann would produce all three Morrie's studio albums. His first release was the single "Paradox" on October 21, 1990, and exactly one month later his debut solo album "Ignorance" was published. In the upcoming five years, he released a few more singles (second "Shisen no Kairaku" featured cover of "In My Room" by The Walker Brothers) and two more studio albums, Romantic na, Amari ni Romantic na in 1992 and Kage no Kyoen in 1995, before seemingly withdrawing from the public eye for almost ten years.

2005–present: Return to music and Creature Creature 
In 2005, Morrie's solo best of album Ectoplasm was released and marked his return to music. At the end of the year he announced the formation of his rock band Creature Creature, that included bassist Tetsuya (from L'Arc~en~Ciel), guitarist Minoru Kojima (from The Mad Capsule Markets), and drummer Shinya Yamada (from Luna Sea). They performed at the year-end event Danger IV at Nippon Budokan as a secret musical act. In 2006, three singles were released on the same day of July, and on August 30 their debut studio album Light&Lust was released on Danger Crue Records. During the album's recording, Morrie was joined by Dead End members You, Minato and Joe, and their producer Hajime Okano, who each contributed to several songs. Morrie said it was a moving moment for him, and said about the meeting that "I was curious what kind of musician and persons they became. After they played I started thinking that a Dead End reunion would be extraordinary". The band performed only two times that year, at the next Danger V event and the held Light&Lust concert at Shibuya-AX in December.

It was quiet for another two years, until June 2009, when two Creature Creature concerts in Tokyo and Osaka were held starting the Simone and the Wrath tour series, but with different a line-up, featuring guitarist Hiro (from La'cryma Christi), guitarist Shinobu (from Guy's Family), bassist Hitoki (from Kuroyume), and drummer Sakura (from L'Arc~en~Ciel). In August, Morrie and the other Dead End members reunite, and held a their first concert in almost twenty years. In November they released their new album and did not stop with activity in upcoming years. In December, with Creature Creature, Morrie held two concerts in Shanghai, China, and performed at the Jack in the Box and Beat Shuffle events at Nippon Budokan and Omiya Sonic City respectively.

On July 21, 2010, Creature Creature's second studio album Inferno was released and throughout this and next year they held the smaller Purgatory, Inferno, and Paradise tours. The single "Psyche Telos" was released on June 12, 2011, by Psyche Records, a record label owned by Morrie. In September they went on the Exorcising Orpheus tour, and released a live concert video of the same name recorded at the Paradise tour finale. In June and August 2012, the singles "Rakuen/Ataraxia" and "Kurumeki/Sexus", as well as the Sodom and Gomorah tour, were followed by the release on October 17 of the band's third studio album Phantoms.

In 2012, Morrie performed his first solo live concert in twenty years. Extasis was held on his birthday, where he performed old and new songs. The following year he held The Nostalgia of the Infinite birthday and two Nowhere Nobody concerts. In 2014 for his fiftieth anniversary was held the third consecutive birthday concert, Now I Here Eternity, with Sugizo, Kiyoharu, You and Joe as special guests. In May was followed by the Boys of the Flesh concert. On December 25, 2014, was pre-released Morrie's fourth studio album Hard Core Reveire, and first in almost twenty years. It was generally released on January 21, 2015, on Morrie's indie label Nowhere Music. The album's music is uniquely experimental, while the concept is that the reality is a dream, a hardcore illusion of waking up. On March 4, was released a limited to 500 copies half-century commemorative work Book of M: From Nowhere To Nowhere based on the concept "from birth to death", accompanied with a 25-minute long DVD. Over the years he continued to perform his Solitude one-man solo shows.

Morrie featured on three songs from Aoki Yutaka's album Lost in Forest, and one song, for which also contributed the lyrics, to the album Oneness M by Sugizo. On March 15, 2017, Creature Creature's released their fourth studio album Death is a Flower, and the band held the second part of its tour between December 2016 and March 2017. Because they felt they had "come full circle" conceptually with Death is a Flower, and because Morrie wanted to focus on his solo activities, Creature Creature went on hiatus after July 8, 2018.

On 27 August 2017, Morrie performed an intimate solo show at Kraine Theater in New York City. It was his first official solo live performance outside Japan. He reprised the performance at Kraine Theater on 31 January 2018, with a third performance scheduled for 26 August was part of his solo tour Morrie the Universe "Solitude" Season 6 which will start in September. In addition, his fifth solo studio album was announced for a future release. On 19 April 2019, was released fifth studio album In The Shining Wilderness, which was followed by a solo tour with a band in February and March, and from then until December 2019 by his 7th solo Solitude tour series. On 7 September 2022 was released sixth studio album Ballad D, a "self-cover" album of Dead End songs, featuring Sugizo, Sakito and Heather Paauwe.

Musical style and lyrics 
Morrie's lyrics throughout his career were inspired by philosophical questions about the human being, I, good and evil, justice, truth, beauty, as well those people who devoted their lives trying to solve them. Compared to Dead End, in Creature Creature, he freely explores his ideas with other musicians and the creation is "more centripetal with lyrical content evoked by philosophical questions of being and what is I". In the classical music he is especially fond of Richard Wagner and Johann Sebastian Bach.

Creature Creature support members 
Morrie's backing band for Creature Creature:

Discography

Solo work 
Studio albums
 Ignorance (November 21, 1990)
 
  
 Hard Core Reverie (January 21, 2015) Oricon #252
 
 Ballad D (September 7, 2022) Oricon #35 Billboard Japan Top Albums #30

Compilation albums
 Ectoplasm (April 20, 2005)

Singles

Creature Creature 
Albums
 Light&Lust (August 30, 2006) Oricon #15
 Inferno (July 21, 2010) Oricon #40
 Phantoms (October 17, 2012) Oricon #51
 Death is a Flower (March 15, 2017) Oricon #144

Singles
  Oricon #29
 "Red" (July 19, 2006) Oricon #27
  Oricon #26
 "Psychetelos" (June 12, 2011)
  Oricon #89
  Oricon #139

DVDs
 Exorcising Orpheus: Paradise Tour Final (October 20, 2011) Oricon #185
 Beyond Light & Lust (April 23, 2020)

Notes

a.  Ōtsuka's surname is sometimes also spelled as Otsuka, Ohtsuka.

References

External links 
 
 Creature Creature websIte
 Morrie as an Art Nomade (A dedicated website since March 1998)

Visual kei musicians
Japanese heavy metal singers
Japanese male rock singers
Japanese male singer-songwriters
Japanese lyricists
Musicians from Hyōgo Prefecture
1964 births
Living people
English-language singers from Japan